Edson is an unincorporated community in Sherman County, Kansas, United States. As of the 2020 census, the population of the community and nearby areas was 17.

History
Edson was named for settler Ed Harris, and his son. The first post office in Edson was established in 1888.  The ZIP code is 67733.

Edson was a station and shipping point on the Chicago, Rock Island and Pacific Railroad.

Geography

Climate
According to the Köppen Climate Classification system, Edson has a semi-arid climate, abbreviated "BSk" on climate maps.

Demographics

For statistical purposes, the United States Census Bureau has defined this community as a census-designated place (CDP).

Education
The community is served by Goodland USD 352 public school district.

Edson schools were closed through school unification. The Edson Rockets won the Kansas State High School boys class BB Track & Field championship in 1965.

References

Further reading

External links
 Sherman County maps: Current, Historic, KDOT

Unincorporated communities in Sherman County, Kansas
Unincorporated communities in Kansas